Teriʻitariʻa I (c. 1769–1793) was the king of the island of Huahine located among the Society Islands, in French Polynesia. It is in the South Pacific and includes the island of Tahiti.

Biography
He was born in 1769. His parents were Queen Tehaapapa I of Huahine and Chief Mato of Raiatea and Huahine, and his sister was Queen Tura'iari'i Ehevahine.  Teriʻitaria became a king in 1790 after death of his mother. He was deposed in 1793 by his half-brother Tenania.

He died the same year.

His niece was Queen Teriitaria II.

Family

See also
Kingdom of Huahine
List of monarchs of Huahine

References

Oceanian monarchs
Huahine royalty
1769 births
1793 deaths